Heikki Markku Julius Westerinen (born 27 April 1944) is a Finnish chess player, born in Helsinki.
He became a national master at age sixteen, and earned the FIDE titles of International Master in 1967 and Grandmaster in 1975.
Westerinen won the Finnish Championship in 1965, 1966, 1968, and 1970.
He played for the national team in the biennial Chess Olympiads from 1962 through 1996, and 2006.
Westerinen's best tournament results include third place at Berlin 1971, tie for second place at Oslo 1973, first at Sant Feliu de Guixols 1973, and first at Dortmund 1973 and 1975.
His style is described as original and combinative.


Notes

References

Further reading

External links
 
 
 

1944 births
Living people
Chess grandmasters
Chess Olympiad competitors
Finnish chess players
Sportspeople from Helsinki